The Isle of Man International Business School is an institution of higher education on the Isle of Man.

The Business School is located in the Nunnery mansion estate, close to the island's capital Douglas.

It provides various academic degrees and professional qualifications in many different areas of business and finance, to students from all around the world.

The building changed its use in 2012. From a standalone institution, it has become a campus of the Isle of Man College dedicated to higher education. In 2016, the college changed its name to University College Isle of Man (UCM).

External links
 Isle of Man International Business School web site

Educational organisations based in the Isle of Man
Economy of the Isle of Man
Business schools in Europe
Douglas, Isle of Man